Kris Kross was an American hip hop duo, consisting of Chris "Mac Daddy" Kelly and Chris "Daddy Mac" Smith.

Kris Kross was the youngest hip-hop duo to gain success, with gold and platinum albums at 12 and 13 years old. The duo was discovered by Jermaine Dupri in 1991 and hit worldwide status the following year with their smash hit debut single, "Jump", which topped the Billboard Hot 100 for eight weeks and was certified double platinum as a single. They went on to release three studio albums, with their debut album Totally Krossed Out topping the US Billboard 200, and their following albums, Da Bomb and Young, Rich & Dangerous making it into the Top 20. The duo were also noted for their signature fashion style of wearing their clothes backwards.

Chris Kelly died of a drug overdose on May 1, 2013. He has been referenced on the albums or songs of Eminem, Dr. Dre, 2Pac, Method Man, and many more.

History
The friendship of Atlanta, Georgia natives, James Christopher Kelly (August 11, 1978 – May 1, 2013) and Christopher Smith (born January 10, 1979), began in first grade. The duo was discovered at Greenbriar Mall in Atlanta in 1991 by then-19-year-old Jermaine Dupri.

1992: Totally Krossed Out
Along with Dupri, the two signed a deal with Ruffhouse Records and recorded their debut album Totally Krossed Out (1992). Entirely produced by Dupri, Totally Krossed Out was released March 31 that year and sold four million copies in the U.S. It included the hit single "Jump", which became the first rap song to top the Billboard Hot 100 for eight weeks.

The music videos from the album also experienced major success. The video for "Jump", directed by filmmaker Rich Murray, went to No. 1 on MTV and sold over 100,000 copies as a VHS video single. The video for their follow-up single, "Warm It Up", also directed by Murray, won a Billboard video award for "Best New Artist", and got to No. 14 the same year as "Jump". Writes The New York Daily News''' Jim Farber: "Together, that was enough to propel the duo's debut album, Totally Krossed Out, to multi-platinum status."

1992–1998: Michael Jackson tour and additional media projects
The duo landed a spot on Michael Jackson's 1992 European Dangerous World Tour as well as a cameo appearance on Jackson's music video for his 1992 single "Jam". Additionally, they made appearances in the music videos for Run-D.M.C.'s "Down with the King" (1993) and TLC's "Hat 2 da Back" (1992), and they were featured in an episode of A Different World and as the closing musical act on the May 29, 1992, episode of In Living Color.

A video game starring the pair, titled Kris Kross: Make My Video, was released in 1992 on the Sega CD system. It consisted of the players editing together the group's music videos for a few of their hit songs—using portions of the original music videos, stock footage, and general video animation effects. Players were prompted before each editing session to make sure to have certain footage compiled into the video. It was ranked 18th on Electronic Gaming Monthly's list of the "20 Worst Games of All Time". Kris Kross made a cameo appearance in Ted Demme's film Who's the Man? (1993), which starred rapper Ed Lover and radio personality Doctor Dré of Yo! MTV Raps fame.

Kris Kross were also part of the promotional campaign for Sprite in 1993 of which they recorded an exclusive rap, a promotional photoshoot and commercial for the brand.

1993: Da Bomb
The duo's second album, Da Bomb (1993), was certified platinum and spawned the hits "Alright" featuring Super Cat, "I'm Real", and "Da Bomb" featuring Da Brat, whom Smith had discovered. Most of their songs had been directed at rivals Da Youngstas, Illegal, and Another Bad Creation.

1996: Young, Rich & Dangerous
A third album, Young, Rich & Dangerous'', was released in early 1996 and was certified gold. It spawned the two hits "Tonite's tha Night" and "Live and Die for Hip Hop".

Education
Both members of Kris Kross went to Woodward Academy in College Park, Georgia. Kelly studied mix-engineering, and founded C Connection Records. Smith studied marketing and business management and founded One Life Entertainment, Inc.

Final show
Kris Kross' last performance was in their hometown at the Fox Theatre for So So Def's 20th Anniversary concert in 2013.

Death of Chris Kelly
On April 29, 2013, Chris Kelly was found unconscious in his Atlanta home and taken to the hospital. Two days later, on May 1, he was pronounced dead around 5 p.m. on the south campus of the Atlanta Medical Center; he was 34 years old. Apparently one day before his death, he filmed himself rapping in his home. According to the police report documents, Kelly had been brought home to recover from his drug use, as he had done several times in the past. His uncle told police that Kelly "had an extensive history of drug abuse."

The following day, Dupri tweeted a "letter to fans", in which he referred to Kelly as "a son that I never had", and praised Kelly as an artist. Chris Smith wrote, "Chris Kelly was my Best Friend. He was like a brother. I love him and will miss him dearly. Our friendship began as little boys in first grade. We grew up together. It was a blessing to achieve the success, travel the world and entertain Kris Kross fans all around the world with my best friend. It is what we wanted to do and what brought us happiness. I will always cherish the memories of the C-Connection."

Numerous other artists and fans publicly acknowledged Kelly's death, some citing Kris Kross or Kelly as their inspiration or their reason for entering the music industry. On July 1, a toxicology report was released stating that Kelly died from a drug overdose. According to the Fulton County Medical Examiner Office, the toxicology screening showed that Kelly had a mixture of drugs in his system, including heroin and cocaine. Kelly is buried at the Westview Cemetery in Atlanta.

Discography

Studio albums

Remix albums

Compilation albums

Singles

References

External links

 Billboard Magazine: Kris Kross
 Chris "Mac Daddy" Kelly at Find A Grave

1990 establishments in Georgia (U.S. state)
1998 disestablishments in Georgia (U.S. state)
African-American musical groups
American boy bands
American musical duos
Columbia Records artists
Hip hop duos
Musical groups disestablished in 1998
Musical groups established in 1990
Musical groups from Atlanta
Ruffhouse Records artists
Southern hip hop groups